Dasein ohne Leben – Psychiatrie und Menschlichkeit (Existence Without Life – Psychiatry and Humanity) is a 1942 Nazi propaganda film about the physically and mentally disabled. The film labeled inherited mental illness as a threat to public health and society, and called for extermination of those affected.

The film was not released to the public, but was shown to perpetrators of the euthanasia program and to other leading figures. All known copies of the film were thought to be lost, but after the politico-economic turnaround in the former GDR following reunification, eight reels of "the 23 rolls Schweninger shot for these films, complete with soundtracks" were found in 1989-1990 in Potsdam.

Plot 

The theme of the film is the call for the killing of mentally ill patients: "Inherited mental illness" is the "greatest public health hazard."  Whoever is "afflicted" bears "the heavy burden of fate: an existence without life".

Embedded in the plot is a brief history of psychiatry. A professor  named "Kämpfer" (English: "fighter") tells two students about the successes achieved in the treatment of mentally ill patients via electro-shock and insulin shock therapy. Shortly before the turn of the 20th century, many new institutions were established in order to accommodate an ever-increasing number of patients. In the setting of the film, there are 1,000 institutions with about 500,000 patients, which have to be cared for by 2,000 physicians and 40,000 nurses. The patients are accommodated in historic buildings in beautiful landscape, none of which is appreciated by the patients.

The second line of argumentation is the suggestive presentation of sick individuals via voice-over. A group of "idiots" in Hartheim Euthanasia Centre is described as follows: "We see here their future destiny, as if reflected in a funhouse mirror". A group of "idiots" in Kindberg, also a euthanasia centre, are "crippled in body and soul, miserable wretches, a burden to both themselves and to others, like ghosts without a will, imagination, or feeling." Further examples from other institutions follow, including Grafeneck Euthanasia Centre. The director of a "large lunatic asylum" appears as an expert: 73% of the parents of his "incurable inmates" were allegedly in favor of "redeeming" them.

Filmmaking 
The director was Hermann Schwenninger, one of the three managing directors of Gemeinnützige Krankentransport ("Charitable Ambulance"), a front company of Aktion T4, the central institution for the mass murder of patients in the Third Reich. Schwenninger also wrote parts of the screenplay of Ich klage an. The contract for the film came from Hitler's Chancellery, and was produced by Tobis Film.

For the filmmaking, Schwenninger shot the complete course of the NS euthanasia program, including the transport of the frightened patients to the killing institutions, and through an observation window the murder in a gas chamber of the center Pirna-Sonnenstein. During the one and a half year of production, the film team visited 20 to 30 institutions throughout Nazi Germany.

Film screening 

The film only screened in closed circles.

In March 1942, the film was premiered in front of 28 physicians. They were joined by Herbert Linden, Otto Wuth (psychiatrist of the army health system), three top politicians of the health care administration of Baden, Bavaria and Württemberg and Hellmuth Unger, a writer.

On December 22, 1942, the film was shown at the Military Medical Academy. The invited audience consisted of the top officials of the Sicherheitspolizei, the Gestapo, the RKPA, Federal Ministry of the Interior, the Hitler Youth, the doctors of the military service, the head of the medical services of the Luftwaffe, eight doctors of the military academy, and the director of the Berlin Health Office.

In January 1943, Arthur Nebe screened Existence Without Life to hundreds of SS officers, who received it enthusiastically.

Copies 
Copies of the complete film as released are lost today, although there were at least six copies circulating among Nazi organizations, the SS, and the Wehrmacht staffs. It was assumed that the copies were destroyed before the Allies invaded but eight reels of the film were found in a GDR film archive. The eight reels, five to ten minutes each, are viewable online at the United States Holocaust Memorial Museum website. Some pre-production parts can be found in the Steven Spielberg Film and Video Archive.

A reconstruction of the film was made in the Channel Four documentary, Selling Murder: The Secret Propaganda Films of the Third Reich (1991) using the original script contained within the Federal German Archives and original footage of the mentally disabled but with actors for the roles of students and the professor.

See also 
 Nazism and cinema
 Propaganda in Nazi Germany

Literature

External links

Annotations

References 

1942 films
Films about euthanasia
Lost German films
Nazi eugenics
Nazi propaganda films
German black-and-white films
German documentary films
1942 documentary films
Rediscovered German films